Davinder Singh may refer to:

 Davinder Singh (footballer), Indian footballer
 Davinder Singh (field hockey), Indian field hockey player
 Davinder Singh (lawyer), Singaporean former politician and lawyer
 Davinder Singh Deegan, Kenyan field hockey player
 Devinder Singh Garcha, Indian politician
 Davinder Singh Kang, Indian track and field athlete
 Devinder Singh Garcha, Indian politician
 Devender Singh, Indian artist
 Devender Singh Babli, Indian politician
 Devender Singh Shokeen, Indian former politician
 Devinderjeet Singh Laddi Dhose, Indian politician